Patricia Álvarez Nárdiz (born 4 March 1998) is a field hockey player from Spain.

Personal life
Patricia Álvarez was born and raised in Santander, Spain. She is a student at the Universidad Complutense de Madrid.

Career

Under–21
Patricia Álvarez made her debut for the Spanish U–21 side in 2019 at the EuroHockey Junior Championship in Valencia. At the tournament she won a gold medal.

Las Redsticks
Álvarez made her senior debut for Las Redsticks in 2021 at the EuroHockey Championships in Amsterdam.

She was named in the Spain squad for the 2021–22 FIH Pro League.

References

External links

1998 births
Living people
Female field hockey forwards
Spanish female field hockey players
Sportspeople from Santander, Spain